Harpendyreus hazelae is a butterfly in the family Lycaenidae. It is found in Malawi and Zambia.

References

Butterflies described in 1973
Harpendyreus